Henry Bird "Harry" Glasgow (20 June 1939 – 4 February 2016) was a Scottish football player and manager.

Glasgow began his career with Falkirk, where he made four appearances, all of which came in cup competitions. He spent a season on loan at Arbroath, before joining Clyde. He spent nine years at Shawfield Stadium, making 282 appearances, scoring nine goals. He was captain during his time at the club, and is one of Clyde's greatest servants. He joined Stenhousemuir in 1972, where he played for three seasons before retiring. Glasgow then managed Stenhousemuir.

Honours 
Stenhousemuir
Stirlingshire Cup 1975-76

References 

 
 

Association football defenders
Scottish footballers
Falkirk F.C. players
Arbroath F.C. players
Clyde F.C. players
Stenhousemuir F.C. players
Scottish Football League players
Scottish football managers
Stenhousemuir F.C. managers
1939 births
2016 deaths
Scottish Football League managers